Tropical is an EP by Shit and Shine, released on 14 October 2014 by Gangsigns.

Track listing

Personnel
Adapted from the Tropical liner notes.
Shit and Shine
 Craig Clouse – vocals, instruments
Production and additional personnel
 Andrew Smith – cover art

Release history

References

External links 
 

2014 EPs
Shit and Shine albums